Newton Municipal Airport  is a city-owned public-use airport located two miles (3 km) southeast of the central business district of Newton, a city in Jasper County, Iowa, United States.  The airport is adjacent to Iowa Speedway.

Facilities and aircraft 
For the 12-month period ending September 12, 2007, the airport had 9,000 aircraft operations, an average of 24 per day: 93% general aviation and 7% air taxi. At that time there were 21 aircraft based at this airport: 90% single-engine and 10% multi-engine.

Fly Iowa 2011
On September 17, 2011, Newton was scheduled to be the host of the annual Fly Iowa Airshow. Fly Iowa travels to different towns in Iowa and hosts airshows for the public.

References

External links 
 

Airports in Iowa
Transportation buildings and structures in Jasper County, Iowa
Newton, Iowa